Robert Dighton (by 1491–1546), of Lincoln and Little Sturton, Lincolnshire, was an English politician.

He was a Member (MP) of the Parliament of England for Lincoln in 1539.

Notes

References

15th-century births
1546 deaths
People from East Lindsey District
People from Lincoln, England
English MPs 1539–1540